Cody Austin Poteet (born July 30, 1994) is an American professional baseball pitcher in the Kansas City Royals organization. He previously played in Major League Baseball (MLB) for the Miami Marlins.

Amateur career
Poteet attended Christian High School in El Cajon, California. After his senior year, he was selected by the Washington Nationals in the 27th round of the 2012 MLB draft, but did not sign and instead enrolled at UCLA to play college baseball. In 2014, he played collegiate summer baseball with the Yarmouth–Dennis Red Sox of the Cape Cod Baseball League. As a junior at UCLA in 2015, he appeared in 27 games (13 starts) and pitched to a 7–1 record with a 2.45 ERA; he was also second for the Bruins in strikeouts with 68 over  innings.

Professional career

Miami Marlins
After his junior year, Poteet was selected by the Miami Marlins in the fourth round of the 2015 MLB draft. He signed with the Marlins for $488,700 and was assigned to the Batavia Muckdogs of the Class A Short Season New York–Penn League where he posted a 2.13 ERA in  innings pitched. In 2016, he played for the Greensboro Grasshoppers of the Class A South Atlantic League where he started 24 games, pitching to a 4–9 record with a 2.91 ERA, and in 2017, he pitched with the Jupiter Hammerheads of the Class A-Advanced Florida State League and posted a 3–7 record with a 4.16 ERA in 16 games (14 starts), earning All-Star honors. In 2018, he played with both Jupiter and the Jacksonville Jumbo Shrimp of the Class AA Southern League, pitching to a combined 4–15 record and 4.98 ERA over 26 games (25 starts) between both teams. He returned to Jacksonville to begin 2019, where he was named an All-Star, and was promoted to the Class AAA New Orleans Baby Cakes of the Pacific Coast League in June. Over 23 starts between the two clubs, he went 7–6 with a 3.56 ERA, striking out 92 over  innings. Poteet did not play a minor league game in 2020 due to the cancellation of the minor league season caused by the COVID-19 pandemic. To begin the 2021 season, he was assigned to Jacksonville, now members of the Triple-A East.

On May 12, 2021, Poteet was selected to active roster and promoted to the major leagues for the first time. He made his major league debut that night as the team's starting pitcher versus the Arizona Diamondbacks, and picked up the win after pitching five innings, giving up two earned runs. In the game, he also recorded his first MLB strikeout against catcher Stephen Vogt. He was placed on the 10-day injured list with a right knee sprain in late June, and was transferred to the 60-day injured list in late August, effectively ending his season. He finished his first major league season with the Marlins starting seven games with a 2-3 record, a 4.99 ERA, and 32 strikeouts over  innings.

Poteet pitched in 12 games for Miami in 2022, posting a 3.86 ERA with 21 strikeouts in 28.0 innings of work. On August 9, 2022, it was announced that Poteet would require Tommy John surgery and would miss the remainder of the season. He elected free agency on November 10.

Kansas City Royals
On December 15, 2022, Poteet signed a minor league deal with the Kansas City Royals.

Personal life
Poteet and his wife, Madeline (a former UCLA women's basketball player), were married in August 2014 on the UCLA campus.

References

External links

UCLA Bruins bio

1994 births
Living people
Baseball players from San Diego
Major League Baseball pitchers
Miami Marlins players
UCLA Bruins baseball players
Yarmouth–Dennis Red Sox players
Gulf Coast Marlins players
Batavia Muckdogs players
Greensboro Grasshoppers players
Jupiter Hammerheads players
Jacksonville Jumbo Shrimp players
New Orleans Baby Cakes players
Águilas Cibaeñas players
American expatriate baseball players in the Dominican Republic